Hennadiy Prykhodko (born 14 August 1973) is a former Ukrainian football midfielder and football manager.

Career
Prykhodko started his football career in the Soviet Union, played for FC Dynamo Bila Tserkva in 1990 in the Soviet Second League B, then played in some Ukrainian teams of different leagues. He retired in 2005 as a professional and in 2008 as an amateur player.

Personal life
Prykhodko is the father of the Ukrainian footballer Klim Prykhodko.

References

External links

 

1973 births
Living people
Sportspeople from Kryvyi Rih
Ukrainian footballers
Soviet footballers
Ukrainian football managers
FC Ros Bila Tserkva players
FC Kryvbas Kryvyi Rih players
FC Torpedo Zaporizhzhia players
FC Dnipro players
FC Dnipro-2 Dnipropetrovsk players
FC Zirka Kropyvnytskyi players
FC Zirka-2 Kirovohrad players
Dinaburg FC players
FC Oleksandriya players
FC Nyva Vinnytsia players
FC Hirnyk Kryvyi Rih players
Soviet Second League B players
Ukrainian Premier League players
Ukrainian First League players
Ukrainian Second League players
Latvian Higher League players
Ukrainian expatriate footballers
Expatriate footballers in Latvia
Ukrainian expatriate sportspeople in Latvia
FC Hirnyk Kryvyi Rih managers
FC Kryvbas Kryvyi Rih managers
Association football midfielders
Ukrainian First League managers
Ukrainian Second League managers